Helvibis longistyla is a species of comb-footed spider in the family Theridiidae. It is found in Panama and Trinidad.

References

Theridiidae
Spiders described in 1902
Spiders of the Caribbean
Spiders of Central America